David Halpern (born August 18, 1955) is an American sprint kayaker who competed in the mid-1980s. At the 1984 Summer Olympics in Los Angeles, he placed tenth K-2 500 m. During his competitive career he won over 50 medals in U.S. Nationals competition.  After retiring from international competition, he earned his keep as a writer and cartoonist.  Currently he works as a Ranger for Washington State Parks.

References
Sports-Reference.com profile

1955 births
American male canoeists
Canoeists at the 1984 Summer Olympics
Living people
Olympic canoeists of the United States